Mamadou-Lamine Diabang (born 21 January 1979) is a Senegalese former professional footballer who played as a forward.

References

1979 births
Living people
Senegalese footballers
Senegal international footballers
Association football forwards
Atlas Delmenhorst players
Rotenburger SV players
Arminia Bielefeld players
VfL Bochum players
VfL Bochum II players
Kickers Offenbach players
FC Augsburg players
FK Austria Wien players
Footballers from Dakar
ASC Jeanne d'Arc players
FC Oberneuland players
VfL Osnabrück players
VfB Lübeck players
Bundesliga players
2. Bundesliga players
Footballers from Hesse